Dame "Tweety" Walters (born 27 December 1976 in Clarendon Parish) is a Jamaican soccer player, currently without a club.

Career

Professional
Walters attended Clarendon College in his native Jamaica, before moving to England when he signed a contract with English lower-league club Leyton Orient. Walters never settled in England, and never played a first team game with Orient, returning home to Jamaica to play for Tivoli Gardens in the Jamaica National Premier League in 2002. He won the JNPL title with Tivoli in 2003/2004.

Walters moved to the United States in 2006, and played 16 games with the Atlanta Silverbacks U23's as an over-age player in the USL Premier Development League, before moving onto the senior Atlanta Silverbacks team the following year.

He was released by the Silverbacks at the end of the season, and subsequently signed with the Wilmington Hammerheads in the USL Second Division in 2008, where he was named to the USL2 All-League Second Team. He re-signed for the Hammerheads in 2009.

Honors

Wilmington Hammerheads
USL Second Division Regular Season Champions (1): 2009

References

External links
 Wilmington Hammerheads bio

1976 births
Living people
Atlanta Silverbacks players
Atlanta Silverbacks U23's players
Leyton Orient F.C. players
USL First Division players
USL Second Division players
Wilmington Hammerheads FC players
Tivoli Gardens F.C. players
USL League Two players
Association football defenders
Jamaican footballers
Jamaican expatriate footballers
Expatriate soccer players in the United States
People from Clarendon Parish, Jamaica